In the field of heat transfer, intensity of radiation  is a measure of the distribution of radiant heat flux per unit area and solid angle, in a particular direction, defined according to

where

 is the infinitesimal source area 
 is the outgoing heat transfer from the area 
 is the solid angle subtended by the infinitesimal 'target' (or 'aperture') area 
 is the angle between the source area normal vector and the line-of-sight between the source and the target areas.

Typical units of intensity are W·m−2·sr−1.

Intensity can sometimes be called radiance, especially in other fields of study.

The emissive power of a surface can be determined by integrating the intensity of emitted radiation over a hemisphere surrounding the surface:

For diffuse emitters, the emitted radiation intensity is the same in all directions, with the result that

The factor  (which really should have the units of steradians) is a result of the fact that intensity is defined to exclude the effect of reduced view factor at large values ; note that the solid angle corresponding to a hemisphere is equal to  steradians.

Spectral intensity  is the corresponding spectral measurement of intensity; in other words, the intensity as a function of wavelength.

See also 
 Non-ionising radiation 
 Emissivity
 Radiant intensity

References 

 Lienhard and Lienhard, A heat transfer textbook, 5th Ed, 2019 (available for free online)
 J P Holman,  Heat Transfer 9th Ed, McGraw Hill, 2002.
 F. P. Incropera and D. P. DeWitt, Fundamentals of Heat and Mass Transfer, 4th Ed, Wiley, 1996.

Heat transfer
Radiation